Westover is a historic Southern plantation in Milledgeville, Georgia, USA.

History
The plantation was established in 1822 by Benjamin S. Jordan. Jordan built the great house, several outbuildings (including a smoke house and slave cabins), and laid out a formal garden. After his death in 1856, the plantation was inherited by his son, Leonidas A. Jordan.

The plantation was purchased by Dr. L. C. Lindsley, a Professor of Chemistry at Georgia College, in 1930. The great house burned down after being struck by lightning in 1954. The current home was built in its place.

The plantation includes outbuildings and a slave cemetery.

References

1822 establishments in Georgia (U.S. state)
Houses on the National Register of Historic Places in Georgia (U.S. state)
Burned houses in the United States
Houses in Baldwin County, Georgia
Plantations in Georgia (U.S. state)
National Register of Historic Places in Baldwin County, Georgia
Slave cabins and quarters in the United States